Crixás River may refer to several rivers in Brazil:

Crixás River (Goiás), a river of Goiás state in central Brazil
Crixás River (Tocantins), a river of Tocantins state in central Brazil
Crixás Açu River, a river of Goiás state in central Brazil
Crixás Mirim River, a river of Goiás state in central Brazil